Ramiz Akhmerov (born 8 March 1953) is a former tennis player from Azerbaijan who competed for the Soviet Union in the Davis Cup.

Akhmerov, who was runner-up to Alexander Zverev at the 1979 Soviet Championships, won three Summer Universiade medals. He earned a bronze medal at the 1977 event and won both a gold and silver medal at the 1979 Summer Universiade.

He made his Davis Cup debut in 1979, at Barcelona, where he lost a singles rubber to Spain's Antonio Munoz. His only other Davis Cup appearance came in Donetsk three years later. He and partner Vadim Borisov played the doubles rubber against India's Amritraj brothers, Anand and Vijay. The Soviet pairing lost the match in four sets.

References

1953 births
Living people
Azerbaijani male tennis players
Soviet male tennis players
Universiade medalists in tennis
Universiade gold medalists for the Soviet Union
Universiade silver medalists for the Soviet Union
Universiade bronze medalists for the Soviet Union
Medalists at the 1977 Summer Universiade
Medalists at the 1979 Summer Universiade